Westwood Elementary School may refer to:

Westwood Elementary in Cincinnati, Ohio
Westwood Elementary School (Prince George)